União Desportiva do Songo  is a Mozambican professional football club based in Songo, Cahora-Bassa, that competes in the Moçambola.

The club was founded by the Hidroeléctrica de Cahora Bassa company as Grupo Desportivo da Hidroeléctrica de Cahora Bassa de Songo, or simply HCB Songo in 1982.

Stadium
Currently the team plays at the 2,000 capacity Estadio da HCB.

Current squad

Achievements
Moçambola: 3
2017, 2018, 2022

Taça de Moçambique: 2
2016, 2019.

Supertaça de Moçambique: 0

Performance in CAF competitions
CAF Confederation Cup: 1 appearance
2017 – Preliminary Round

References

External links

Soccerway

Football clubs in Mozambique